Datian may refer to the following locations in China:

Datian County (大田县), of Sanming, Fujian
Datian Station (大田站), freight station of the Guangzhou–Zhuhai Railway in Baiyun District, Guangzhou, Guangdong
Datian Subdistrict (临海市), in Linhai, Zhejiang
Towns named Datian (大田镇)
Datian, Enping, in Enping, Guangdong
Datian, Dongfang, Hainan, in Dongfang, Hainan
Datian, Pingdu, in Pingdu, Shandong
Datian, Panzhihua, in Renhe District, Panzhihua, Sichuan
Datian, Tianjin, in Binhai New Area, Tianjin
Datian Township (大田乡)
Datian Township, Taining County, in Taining County, Fujian
Datian Township, Qinglong County Guizhou, in Qinglong County, Guizhou
Datian Township, Gan County, in Gan County, Jiangxi
Datian Township, Hanyuan County, in Hanyuan County, Sichuan
Datian Township, Wuyi County, Zhejiang, in Wuyi County, Zhejiang